Haitian Vodoun Culture Language (known as  and ; literally "language") is a specialized vocabulary used in Haiti for religion, song, and dance purposes. It appears to not be an actual language, but rather an assortment of words, songs, and incantations – some secret – from various languages once used in Haitian Vodoun ceremonies.

See also
Haitian Vodou
Lucumí language

References

Afro-Haitian culture
Haitian Vodou
Languages of Haiti
Languages of the African diaspora
Ritual languages
Unclassified languages of North America